Shoshauna Routley (born 20 October 1986) is a Canadian professional racing cyclist. She rode in the women's team time trial at the 2015 UCI Road World Championships.

Shoshauna is married to Will Routley, retired men's pro cyclist last with the Rally Cycling Team in 2016.

References

External links

1986 births
Living people
Canadian female cyclists
Place of birth missing (living people)